Douglas Walgren (born December 28, 1940) is an American attorney and politician who served as a Democratic member of the U.S. House of Representatives from Pennsylvania from 1977 to 1991.

Early life
Walgren was born in Rochester, New York, and grew up in Mount Lebanon, Pennsylvania. He graduated from Dartmouth College in 1963, and received his LL.B. from Stanford University in 1966. While at Stanford, he roomed off-campus with Dr. K. Barry Sharpless, who went on to be awarded the Nobel Prize for his work in chemistry.

Legal work
Walgren was staff attorney for Neighborhood Legal Services in Pittsburgh, Pennsylvania from 1967 to 1968, and then he engaged in private practice in Pittsburgh from 1969 to 1972. He served as corporate counsel for Behavioral Research Laboratories, Inc. in Palo Alto, California, from 1973 to 1975.

Congressional career
He was elected in 1976 as a Democrat to the 95th and to the six succeeding Congresses. He was an unsuccessful candidate for reelection in 1990. Walgren was defeated by Rick Santorum, who, four years later, was elected Pennsylvania's junior United States senator.

Sources

The Political Graveyard
 

1940 births
Living people
People from Mt. Lebanon, Pennsylvania
American people of Swedish descent
Democratic Party members of the United States House of Representatives from Pennsylvania
American lawyers
Dartmouth College alumni
Stanford University alumni
Members of Congress who became lobbyists